Machimia intaminata is a moth in the family Depressariidae. It was described by Edward Meyrick in 1922. It is found in Minas Gerais, Brazil.

The wingspan is about 19 mm.

References

Moths described in 1922
Machimia